Nevermind is the second studio album by the American rock band Nirvana, released on September 24, 1991, by DGC Records. It was Nirvana's first release on a major label and the first to feature drummer Dave Grohl. Produced by Butch Vig, Nevermind features a more polished, radio-friendly sound than the band's prior work. It was recorded at Sound City Studios in Van Nuys, California, and Smart Studios in Madison, Wisconsin in May and June 1991, and mastered that August at the Mastering Lab in Hollywood, California.

Written primarily by frontman Kurt Cobain, the album is noted for channeling a range of emotions, being noted as dark, humorous, and disturbing. Thematically, it includes anti-establishment views, anti-sexism, frustration, alienation, and troubled love inspired by Cobain's broken relationship with Bikini Kill's Tobi Vail. Contrary to the popular hedonistic themes of drugs and sex at the time, writers have observed that Nevermind re-invigorated sensitivity to mainstream rock. According to Cobain, the sound of the album was influenced by bands such as Pixies, R.E.M., the Smithereens, and Melvins. Though the album is considered a cornerstone of the grunge genre, it is noted for its musical diversity, which includes acoustic ballads ("Polly" and "Something in the Way") and punk-inspired hard rock ("Territorial Pissings" and "Stay Away").

Nevermind became an unexpected critical and commercial success, hitting top 10 charts across the world. By January 1992, it reached number one on the US Billboard 200 and was selling approximately 300,000 copies a week. The lead single "Smells Like Teen Spirit" reached the top 10 of the US Billboard Hot 100 and went on to be inducted into the Grammy Hall of Fame. Its video was also heavily rotated on MTV. Three other successful singles were released: "Come as You Are", "Lithium", and "In Bloom". The album was voted the best album of the year in Pazz & Jop critics' poll, while "Smells Like Teen Spirit" also topped the single of the year and video of the year polls. The album also garnered the band three Grammy Award nominations in total across the 34th and 35th Grammy Awards, including Best Alternative Music Album.

Nevermind and its singles' success propelled Nirvana to being widely regarded as the biggest band of its time, with Cobain being dubbed by critics as the "voice of his generation.” The album brought grunge and alternative rock to a mainstream audience while ending the dominance of hair metal, drawing similarities to the early 1960s British Invasion of American popular music. It is also often credited with initiating a resurgence of interest in punk culture among teenagers and young adults of Generation X, becoming seminal to the counterculture of the 1990s. It has sold more than 30 million copies worldwide, making it one of the best-selling albums of all time. In March 1999, it was certified Diamond by the RIAA. Among the most acclaimed and influential albums in the history of music, Nevermind was added to the National Recording Registry in 2004 as "culturally, historically, or aesthetically significant", and is frequently ranked highly on lists of the greatest albums of all time.

Background and early sessions
In early 1990, Nirvana began planning their second album for their record company Sub Pop, tentatively titled Sheep. At the suggestion of Sub Pop head Bruce Pavitt, Nirvana selected Butch Vig as producer. The band particularly liked Vig's work with Killdozer. They traveled to Vig's Smart Studios in Madison, Wisconsin, and recorded from April 2 to 6, 1990. Most of the basic arrangements were complete, but songwriter Kurt Cobain was still working on lyrics and the band was unsure of which songs to record. Ultimately, eight were recorded, some of which appeared on Nevermind: "Imodium" (later renamed "Breed"), "Dive" (later released as the B-side to "Sliver"), "In Bloom", "Pay to Play" (later renamed "Stay Away"), "Sappy", "Lithium", "Here She Comes Now" (released on Velvet Underground Tribute Album: Heaven and Hell Volume 1), and "Polly".

On April 6, Nirvana played a local show in Madison with fellow Seattle band Tad.  Vig began to mix the recordings while the band were in Madison,  giving an interview to Madison's community radio station WORT on April 7. Cobain strained his voice, forcing Nirvana to end recording. On April 8, they travelled to Milwaukee to begin an extensive midwest and east coast tour of 24 shows in 39 days.

Drummer Chad Channing left after the tour, putting additional recording on hold. During a show by hardcore punk band Scream, Cobain and bassist Krist Novoselic were impressed by their drummer Dave Grohl. When Scream unexpectedly disbanded, Grohl contacted Novoselic, travelled to Seattle, and was invited to join the band. Novoselic said in retrospect that, with Grohl, everything "fell into place".

By the 1990s, Sub Pop was having financial problems. With rumors that they would become a subsidiary of a major record label, Nirvana decided to "cut out the middleman" and look for a major record label. Nirvana used the recordings as a demo tape to shop for a new label. Within a few months, the tape was circulating amongst major labels. A number of labels courted them; Nirvana signed with Geffen Records imprint DGC Records based on recommendations from Kim Gordon of Sonic Youth and their management company.

After Nirvana signed to DGC, a number of producers were suggested, including Scott Litt, David Briggs, Don Dixon, and Bob Mould. Novoselic said the band had been nervous about recording under a major label, and the producers suggested by DGC wanted percentage points. Instead, the band held out for Vig, with whom they felt comfortable collaborating.

Recording 
With a budget of $65,000, Nirvana recorded Nevermind at Sound City Studios in Van Nuys, California, in May and June 1991. To earn gas money to get to Los Angeles, they played a show where they performed "Smells Like Teen Spirit" for the first time. The band sent Vig rehearsal tapes prior to the sessions that featured songs recorded previously at Smart Studios, plus new songs including "Smells Like Teen Spirit" and "Come as You Are".

Nirvana arrived in California and spent a few days rehearsing and working on arrangements. The only recording carried over from the Smart Studios sessions was "Polly", including Channing's cymbal crashes. Once recording commenced, the band worked eight to ten hours a day. Despite receiving a $287,000 advance upon signing with Geffen, Cobain retained a preference for inexpensive gear—particularly Japanese-made Fender guitars, due to their skinny necks and wider availability in lefthanded orientation.  These included several Stratocasters fitted with humbucker pickups in the bridge positions, as well as a 1965 Jaguar with DiMarzio pickups and a 1969 Mustang, the latter of which Cobain cited as his favorite due its design flaws.  For the album, Cobain bought a rackmount system featuring a Mesa/Boogie Studio preamp, a Crown power amp, and Marshall cabinets.  He also used a Vox AC30 and a Fender Bassman.  Producer Vig preferred not to use pedals, but allowed Cobain to use a Boss DS-1 distortion pedal, which Cobain considered a key part of his sound, as well as an Electro-Harmonix Big Muff fuzz pedal and a Small Clone chorus.  Novoselic used a black 1979 and natural 1976 Gibson Ripper. 

Novoselic and Grohl finished their tracks in days, while Cobain worked longer on guitar overdubs, vocals, and lyrics; he sometimes finished lyrics minutes before recording. Vig recalled that Cobain was often reluctant to record overdubs, but was persuaded to double-track his vocals when he told him that John Lennon did it. Though the sessions generally went well, Vig said Cobain would become difficult at times: "He'd be great for an hour, and then he'd sit in a corner and say nothing for an hour."

Mixing and mastering 
Vig and the band were unhappy with Vig's initial mixes and decided to bring in someone else to oversee the mixing. DGC supplied a list of options, including Scott Litt (known for his work with R.E.M.) and Ed Stasium (known for his work with the Ramones and the Smithereens). Cobain was concerned about bringing in well known producers, and instead chose Andy Wallace, who had co-produced Slayer's 1990 album Seasons in the Abyss. Novoselic recalled, "We said, 'right on,' because those Slayer records were so heavy." 

Wallace's mixes most notably altered the drum and guitar sounds. According to Wallace and Vig, the band loved the results. However, they criticized it after the album was released. Steve Albini, who engineered Nirvana's next album, In Utero (1993), said Vig's initial mix "sounded maybe 200 times more ass-kicking" than the final version of Nevermind and that Nirvana referred to it while working on In Utero.

Nevermind was mastered by  Howie Weinberg on the afternoon of August 2 at the Mastering Lab in Hollywood, California. Weinberg started working alone when no one else arrived at the appointed time in the studio; by the time Nirvana, Andy Wallace, and Gary Gersh arrived, he had mastered most of the album.

A hidden track, "Endless, Nameless", intended to appear at the end of "Something in the Way", was accidentally left off initial pressings of the album. Weinberg recalled, "In the beginning, it was kind of a verbal thing to put that track at the end. (...) Maybe I didn't write it down when Nirvana or the record company said to do it. So, when they pressed the first twenty thousand or so CDs, albums, and cassettes, it wasn't on there." Cobain called Weinberg and demanded he rectify the mistake.

Music

At the time of writing Nevermind, Cobain was listening to bands such as Melvins, R.E.M., the Smithereens, and Pixies, and was writing songs that were more melodic. A key development was the single "Sliver", released on Sub Pop in 1990 before Grohl joined, which Cobain said "was like a statement in a way. I had to write a pop song and release it on a single to prepare people for the next record. I wanted to write more songs like that." Grohl said that the band at that point likened their music to children's music, in that they tried to make their songs as simple as possible.

Cobain fashioned chord sequences using primarily power chords and wrote songs that combined pop hooks with dissonant guitar riffs. His aim for Nevermind's material was to sound like "the Knack and the Bay City Rollers getting molested by Black Flag and Black Sabbath". Many songs feature shifts in dynamics, whereby the band changes from quiet verses to loud choruses. Grohl said this approach originated during a four-month period prior to the recording of the album, when the band would experiment with extreme dynamics during regular jam sessions.

Guitar World wrote, "Kurt Cobain's guitar sound on Nirvana's Nevermind set the tone for Nineties rock music." Cobain played a 1960s Fender Mustang, a Fender Jaguar with DiMarzio pickups, and a few Fender Stratocasters with humbucker bridge pickups. He used distortion and chorus pedals as his main effects, the latter used to generate a "watery" sound on "Come as You Are" and the pre-choruses of "Smells Like Teen Spirit". Novoselic tuned down his bass guitar one and a half steps to D flat "to get this fat-ass sound".

After the release of Nevermind, members of Nirvana expressed dissatisfaction with the production for its perceived commercial sound. Cobain said, "I'm embarrassed by it now. It's closer to a Mötley Crüe record than it is a punk rock record." In 2011, Vig said that Nirvana had "loved" Nevermind when they finished it. He said Cobain had criticized it in the press "because you can't really go, 'Hey, I love our record and I'm glad it sold 10 million copies.' That's just not cool to do. And I think he felt like he wanted to do something more primal."

Lyrics
The album is noted for channeling a range of emotions, being noted as dark, humorous, and disturbing. Thematically, it includes anti-establishment views, and lyrics about sexism, frustration, loneliness, sickness, and troubled love. Contrary to the popular hedonistic themes of drugs and sex at the time, writers have observed that the album re-invigorated sensitivity to mainstream rock. Cobain said that the lyrics were taken from two years of poetry he accumulated, which he then cut up and chose lines he preferred. On the other hand, Grohl has said that Cobain told him, "Music comes first and lyrics come second," and Grohl believes that above all Cobain focused on the melodies of his songs. Cobain was still working on the album's lyrics well into the recording of Nevermind. Additionally, Cobain's phrasing on the album is often difficult to understand. Vig asserted that clarity of Cobain's singing was not paramount. Vig said, "Even though you couldn't quite tell what he was singing about, you knew it was intense as hell." Cobain later complained when rock journalists attempted to decipher his singing and extract meaning from his lyrics, writing: "Why in the hell do journalists insist on coming up with a second-rate Freudian evaluation of my lyrics, when 90 percent of the time they've transcribed them incorrectly?"

Charles R. Cross asserted in his 2001 biography of Cobain, Heavier Than Heaven, that many of the songs written for Nevermind were about Cobain's dysfunctional relationship with Tobi Vail. After their relationship ended, Cobain began writing and painting violent scenes, many of which revealed a hatred for himself and others. Songs written during this period were less violent, but still reflected anger absent from Cobain's earlier songs. Cross wrote, "In the four months following their break-up, Kurt would write a half dozen of his most memorable songs, all of them about Tobi Vail." "Drain You" begins with the line, "One baby to another said 'I'm lucky to have met you,'" quoting what Vail had once told Cobain, and the line "It is now my duty to completely drain you" refers to the power Vail had over Cobain in their relationship. According to Novoselic, "'Lounge Act' is about Tobi," and the song contains the line "I'll arrest myself, I'll wear a shield," referring to Cobain having the K Records logo tattooed on his arm to impress Vail. Though "Lithium" had been written before Cobain knew Vail, the lyrics of the song were changed to reference her. Cobain also said in an interview with Musician that "some of my very personal experiences, like breaking up with girlfriends and having bad relationships, feeling that death void that the person in the song is feeling—very lonely, sick".

Title
The tentative title Sheep was something Cobain created as an inside joke directed towards the people he expected to buy the album. He wrote a fake advertisement for Sheep in his journal that read "Because you want to not; because everyone else is." Novoselic said the inspiration for the title was the band's cynicism about the public's reaction to Operation Desert Storm. As recording ended, Cobain grew tired of the title and suggested to Novoselic that the album be named Nevermind. Cobain liked the title because it was a metaphor for his attitude on life and because it was grammatically incorrect.

"Nevermind" appears on the album liner notes as the last word in a paragraph of lyric fragments that ends with "I found it hard, it was hard to find, oh well, whatever, nevermind" from "Smells Like Teen Spirit". The word "nevermind" also echoes the Sex Pistols' Never Mind the Bollocks, Here's the Sex Pistols, one of Cobain's favorite albums.

Artwork 
The album cover shows a naked baby boy swimming underwater with a U.S. dollar bill on a fishhook just out of his reach. According to Cobain, he conceived the idea while watching a television program on water births. Cobain mentioned it to Geffen's art director Robert Fisher. Fisher found some stock footage of underwater births, but they were too graphic for the record company to use. Furthermore, the stock house that controlled the photo of a swimming baby that they chose wanted $7,500 a year for its use. Instead, Fisher sent a photographer, Kirk Weddle, to a pool for babies to take pictures. Five shots resulted and the band settled on the image of four-month-old Spencer Elden, the son of a friend of Weddle. Geffen was concerned that the infant's penis, visible in the photo, would cause offense, and prepared an alternate cover without it; they relented when Cobain said the only compromise he would accept would be a sticker covering the penis reading: "If you're offended by this, you must be a closet pedophile." The cover has since been recognized as one of the most famous album covers in popular music. A few months after the original baby shot, Weddle also photographed the entire band underwater for a promotional poster.

The back cover features a photograph of a rubber monkey in front of a collage created by Cobain. The collage features photos of raw beef from a supermarket advertisement, images from Dante's Inferno, and pictures of diseased vaginas from Cobain's collection of medical photos. Cobain noted, "If you look real close, there is a picture of Kiss in the back standing on a slab of beef." The album's liner notes contain no complete lyrics; instead, the liner contains random song lyrics and unused lyrical fragments that Cobain arranged into a poem.

Spencer Elden lawsuits 
In August 2021, Elden filed a lawsuit against Weddle, Cobain's estate, Grohl and Novoselic, claiming that the use of his likeness on the album cover was made without his consent or that of his legal guardians, that it violated federal child pornography statutes, and that it resulted in "lifelong damages". Elden said that, by refusing to censor the artwork with a sticker, Nirvana had failed to protect him from child sexual exploitation. The lawsuit also stated that "Cobain chose the image depicting Spencer—like a sex worker—grabbing for a dollar bill that is positioned dangling from a fishhook in front of his nude body with his penis explicitly displayed".

Attorney Jamie White criticized the lawsuit as "frivolous" and "really offensive to the true victims" of child sexual abuse. Fordham Law School professor James Cohen said the context of the cover did not suggest pornography. White and Cohen concluded that Elden intended to make money with the lawsuit. In December, lawyers for the defendants sought to dismiss the lawsuit, saying it was filed too late and that its claim that the image depicts sexual abuse was "not serious". They noted that Elden had "spent three decades profiting from his celebrity as the self-anointed 'Nirvana Baby'", having recreated the artwork several times, and that he had the album title tattooed on his chest. They argued that the cover instead "evokes themes of greed, innocence, and the motif of the cherub in western art". After Elden's lawyers did not file an opposition, the lawsuit was dismissed by a judge on January 3, 2022, however the judge did allow for future lawsuits.

Elden refiled again on January 14, 2022, amending the original suit by removing charges of child sex trafficking while arguing it was child pornography.  On September 2, 2022, a judge ruled against Elden saying he had waited too long to file the suit and cited a 10-year statute of limitations from the date the plaintiff becomes an adult at age 18, meaning Elden needed to file before he turned 28. In addition the judge blocked any additional filings in the future, bringing the case to a "final" close, although Spencer says he intends to appeal.

Release
Nevermind was released on September 24, 1991. American record stores received an initial shipment of 46,251 copies, while 35,000 copies were shipped in the United Kingdom, where Nirvana's first album Bleach had been successful. The lead single "Smells Like Teen Spirit" had been released on September 10 with the intention of building a base among alternative rock fans, while the next single "Come as You Are" would possibly garner more attention. Days before the release date, the band began a short American tour in support of the album. Geffen hoped that Nevermind would sell around 250,000 copies, matching sales of Sonic Youth's Geffen debut Goo. The most optimistic estimate was that Nevermind could be certified gold (500,000 copies sold) by September 1992.

Nevermind debuted on the Billboard 200 at number 144. Geffen shipped about half of the initial U.S. pressing to the American Northwest, where it sold out quickly and was unavailable for days. Geffen put production of all other albums on hold to fulfill demand in the region. Over the next few months, sales increased significantly as "Smells Like Teen Spirit" unexpectedly became more and more popular. The song's video had received a world premiere on MTV's late-night alternative show 120 Minutes, and soon proved so popular that the channel began playing it during the day. "Smells Like Teen Spirit" reached number six on the US Billboard Hot 100. The album was soon certified gold, but the band was relatively uninterested. Novoselic recalled, "Yeah I was happy about it. It was pretty cool. It was kind of neat. But I don't give a shit about some kind of achievement like that. It's cool—I guess."

As the band set out for their European tour at the start of November 1991, Nevermind entered the Billboard Top 40 for the first time at number 35. By this point, "Smells Like Teen Spirit" had become a hit and the album was selling so fast none of Geffen's marketing strategies could be enacted. Geffen president Ed Rosenblatt told The New York Times, "We didn't do anything. It was just one of those 'Get out of the way and duck' records." Nirvana found as they toured Europe during the end of 1991 that the shows were dangerously oversold, television crews became a constant presence onstage, and "Smells Like Teen Spirit" was almost omnipresent on radio and music television.

Nevermind became Nirvana's first number-one album on January 11, 1992, replacing Michael Jackson's Dangerous at the top of the Billboard charts. By this time, Nevermind was selling approximately 300,000 copies a week. It returned for a second week at number one in February. "Come as You Are" was released as the second single in March 1992; it reached number nine on the UK Singles Chart and number 32 on the Billboard Hot 100 singles chart. Two more singles, "Lithium" and "In Bloom", reached number 11 and 28 on the UK Singles Chart.

Nevermind was certified gold and platinum by the Recording Industry Association of America (RIAA) in November 1991 and certified Diamond in March 1999. It was also certified Diamond in Canada (1,000,000 units sold) by the Canadian Recording Industry Association in March 2001 and six times platinum in the United Kingdom. It has gone on to sell more than 30 million copies worldwide, making it one of the best-selling albums of all time.

Critical reception

Geffen's press promotion for Nevermind was lower than that typical of a major record label. The label's publicist primarily targeted music publications with long lead times for publication as well as magazines in the Seattle area. The unexpectedly positive feedback from critics who had received the album convinced the label to consider increasing the album's original print run.

At first, Nevermind did not receive many reviews, and many publications ignored the album. Months after its release and after "Smells Like Teen Spirit" garnered airplay, print media organizations were "scrambling" to cover the phenomenon the album had become. However, by that point, much of the attention fell on Cobain rather than the album itself. The reviews that did initially appear were largely positive. Karen Schoemer of The New York Times wrote, "With 'Nevermind,' Nirvana has certainly succeeded. There are enough intriguing textures, mood shifts, instrumental snippets and inventive word plays to provide for hours of entertainment." Schoemer concluded, "'Nevermind' is more sophisticated and carefully produced than anything peer bands like Dinosaur Jr. and Mudhoney have yet offered."

Entertainment Weekly gave Nevermind an A− rating, and reviewer David Browne argued that on Nevermind, Nirvana "never entertain the notion" of wanting to sound "normal", compared to other contemporary alternative bands. Concluding his enthusiastic review for the British Melody Maker, Everett True wrote that "When Nirvana released Bleach all those years ago, the more sussed among us figured they had the potential to make an album that would blow every other contender away. My God have they proved us right." Spin gave Nevermind a favorable review stating that "you'll be humming all the songs for the rest of your life—or at least until your CD-tape-album wears out." Select compared the band to Jane's Addiction, Sonic Youth, and Pixies, stating that the album "proves that Nirvana truly belong in such high company."

Some reviews were not entirely positive. Rolling Stone gave the album three out of five stars. Reviewer Ira Robbins wrote, "If Nirvana isn't onto anything altogether new, Nevermind does possess the songs, character and confident spirit to be much more than a reformulation of college radio's high-octane hits." The Boston Globe was less enthusiastic about the album; reviewer Steve Morse wrote, "Most of Nevermind is packed with generic punk-pop that had been done by countless acts from Iggy Pop to the Red Hot Chili Peppers," and added "the band has little or nothing to say, settling for moronic ramblings by singer-lyricist Cobain."

Nevermind was voted the best album of the year in The Village Voice Pazz & Jop critics' poll; "Smells Like Teen Spirit" also topped the single of the year and video of the year polls. Nevermind topped the poll by a large majority, and Village Voice critic Robert Christgau wrote in his companion piece to the poll, "As a modest pop surprise they might have scored a modest victory, like De La Soul in 1990. Instead, their multi-platinum takeover constituted the first full-scale public validation of the Amerindie values—the noise, the toons, the 'tude—the radder half of the [Pazz & Jop poll] electorate came up on." In the United Kingdom, the album was ranked number one on NME's Best Fifty LPs of 1991. The album garnered the band three Grammy Award nominations in total at the 34th and 35th Grammy Awards. Among the nominations was the Best Alternative Music Album award.

Legacy

Nevermind popularized the Seattle grunge movement and brought alternative rock as a whole into the mainstream, establishing its commercial and cultural viability and leading to an alternative rock boom in the music industry. Though a short tenure from the album's release to the death of Cobain, the album's and singles' success propelled Nirvana to being regarded by the media as the biggest band in the world — especially throughout 1992. As a grunge act, the band's success over the popular hair metal acts of the time drew similarities to the early 1960s British Invasion of American popular music. The album also initiated a resurgence of interest in punk culture among teenagers and young adults of Generation X. Journalist Chuck Eddy cited Neverminds release as roughly the end of the "high album era".

Billboard writer William Goodman lauds the album, particularly in comparison to the music and image of hair metal acts: "Instead of the chest-beating, coke-blowing, women-objectifying macho rock star of the ’80s, Cobain popularized (or re-invigorated) the image of the sensitive artist, the pro-feminism, anti-authoritarian smart alec punk with a sweet smile and gentle soul." In its citation placing it at number 17 in its 2003 list of the 500 greatest albums of all time, Rolling Stone said, "No album in recent history had such an overpowering impact on a generation—a nation of teens suddenly turned punk—and such a catastrophic effect on its main creator." Gary Gersh, who signed Nirvana to Geffen Records, added that "There is a pre-Nirvana and post-Nirvana record business...'Nevermind' showed that this wasn't some alternative thing happening off in a corner, and then back to reality. This is reality."

The album had an enormous impact towards youth culture. Goodman says that Nevermind "killed off hair metal, and sparked a cultural revolution across the globe". Speaking to the BBC, Brazilian cultural studies academic Moyses Pinto stated that he was struck by Nevermind, saying "I thought: 'this is perfect'; it sounded like a bright synthesis of noise and pop music." In similar praise, Kgomotso Neto says that the impact of Nirvana, as well as MTV, during the time of Nevermind, caused a new youth who listened to the same music and dressed similarly (grunge fashion). Neto further remarks that "there was a cultural homogeneity probably never experienced before" and that "grunge culture became dominant very quickly; all that had been 'cool' suddenly became ugly and exaggerated, and Kurt [Cobain] was the symbol of transgression." Michael Azerrad argued in his Nirvana biography Come as You Are: The Story of Nirvana (1993) that Nevermind marked an epochal generational shift in music similar to the rock-and-roll explosion in the 1950s and the end of the dominance of the baby boomer generation on popular music. Azerrad wrote, "Nevermind came along at exactly the right time. This was music by, for, and about a whole new group of young people who had been overlooked, ignored, or condescended to."

The success of Nevermind surprised Nirvana's contemporaries, who felt dwarfed by its influence. Fugazi frontman Guy Picciotto later said: "It was like our record could have been a hobo pissing in the forest for the amount of impact it had ... It felt like we were playing ukuleles all of a sudden because of the disparity of the impact of what they did." Karen Schoemer of the New York Times wrote that "What's unusual about Nirvana's Nevermind is that it caters to neither a mainstream audience nor the indie rock fans who supported the group's debut album." In 1992, Jon Pareles of The New York Times described the aftermath of the album's breakthrough: "Suddenly, all bets are off. No one has the inside track on which of dozens, perhaps hundreds, of ornery, obstreperous, unkempt bands might next appeal to the mall-walking millions." Record company executives offered large advances and record deals to bands, and replaced their previous strategies of building audiences for alternative bands with the attempts to achieve mainstream popularity quickly.

Nevermind has continued to garner critical praise, has been ranked highly on lists of the most acclaimed albums of all time and is ranked the best album of the 1990s according to Acclaimed Music which statistically aggregates hundreds of published lists. The album was ranked number 17 on Rolling Stones list of The 500 Greatest Albums of All Time, maintaining the rating in a 2012 revised list, and upgrading to number 6 in 2020 revised list. In 2019, Rolling Stone also ranked Nevermind number one on its list of the 100 Best Albums of the '90s, calling it the "album that guaranteed the nineties would not suck." Also in 2019, Nevermind was ranked number one on Rolling Stone's 50 Greatest Grunge Albums list. The magazine ranked the album number 10 in its list of 40 Greatest Punk Albums of All Time too. In 2001, VH1 conducted a poll of more than 500 journalists, music executives and artists which judged Nevermind the second-best album in rock 'n' roll history, behind the Beatles' Revolver. Time placed Nevermind, which writer Josh Tyrangiel called "the finest album of the 90s", on its 2006 list of "The All-TIME 100 Albums". Pitchfork named the album the sixth best of the decade, noting that "anyone who hates this record today is just trying to be cool, and needs to be trying harder." In 2004, the Library of Congress added Nevermind to the National Recording Registry, which collects "culturally, historically or aesthetically important" sound recordings from the 20th century. On the other hand, Nevermind was voted the "Most Overrated Album in the World" in a 2005 BBC public poll. In 2006, readers of Guitar World ranked Nevermind 8th on a list of the 100 Greatest Guitar Recordings. Entertainment Weekly named it the 10th best album of all time on their 2013 list. It was voted number 17 in the third edition of Colin Larkin's All Time Top 1000 Albums (2000). Christgau named it among his 10 best albums from the 1990s and said in retrospect it is an A-plus album. In 2017, "Smells Like Teen Spirit" was inducted into the Grammy Hall of Fame.

Reissues
In 1996, Mobile Fidelity Sound Labs released Nevermind on vinyl as part of its ANADISQ 200 series, and as a 24-karat gold CD. The CD pressings included "Endless, Nameless". The LP version quickly sold out its limited pressing but the CD edition stayed in print for years. In 2009, Original Recordings Group released Nevermind on limited edition 180g blue vinyl and regular 180g black vinyl mastered and cut by Bernie Grundman from the original analog tapes.

In September 2011, the album's 20th anniversary, Universal Music Enterprises reissued Nevermind in a two-CD "deluxe edition" and a four-CD/one-DVD "Super Deluxe Edition". The first disc on both editions features the original album with studio and live B-sides. The second discs feature early session recordings, including the Smart Studio sessions and some band rehearsals recorded with a boombox, plus two BBC session recordings. The "Super Deluxe Edition" also includes Vig's original mix of the album and CD and DVD versions of Live at the Paramount. IFPI reported that as of 2012, the 20th anniversary formats of the album that were released in 2011 had sold nearly 800,000 units. In June 2021, Novoselic revealed that he and Grohl were compiling the 30th-anniversary edition of the album. In September 2021, it was announced that BBC Two in the United Kingdom would celebrate the 30th anniversary with a documentary titled When Nirvana Came to Britain, which featured contributions from Noveselic and Grohl. That same month, a 30th-anniversary edition of Nevermind was announced, which became available in eight-LP and five-CD editions and contained 70 previously unreleased live songs. The CD edition also included a blu-ray of Live in Amsterdam.

Track listing

Notes
 After the initial pressing, CD versions included "Endless, Nameless" as a hidden track which begins after 10 minutes of silence following "Something in the Way", making track 12's total length 20:35. The song is not included on vinyl versions.

Personnel

Nirvana
Kurt Cobain (credited for the "Monkey Photo" as Kurdt Kobain) – vocals, guitars, photography
Krist Novoselic (credited as Chris Novoselic) – bass, vocals on the intro of "Territorial Pissings"
Dave Grohl – drums, backing vocals

Additional musicians
Chad Channing – cymbals on "Polly" (uncredited), drums on the "Smart Studio Sessions" (Deluxe Edition)
Kirk Canning – cello on "Something in the Way"

Technical staff and artwork
Craig Doubet – assistant engineering, mixing
Robin Sloane – DGC/Geffen Records Creative Director
Kurt Cobain – cover concept
Spencer Elden – infant in cover photo
Robert Fisher – artwork, art direction, design, cover design
Michael Lavine – photography
Bob Ludwig – mastering on 20th Anniversary Edition
Jeff Sheehan – assistant engineer
Butch Vig – producer, engineer
Andy Wallace – mixing
Kirk Weddle – cover photo
Howie Weinberg – mastering
Paul Carlsen – engineering/digital editing

Charts

Weekly charts

Year-end charts

Decade-end charts

Certifications

See also
1991 in music
 Album era
Classic Albums: Nirvana – Nevermind
Nevermind It's an Interview
List of best-selling albums
List of best-selling albums in Belgium
List of best-selling albums in France
List of best-selling albums in the United States
List of diamond-certified albums in Canada
Off the Deep End
List of 200 Definitive Albums in the Rock and Roll Hall of Fame

Notes

References

Further reading
Classic Albums—Nirvana: Nevermind [DVD]. Isis Productions, 2004.
Azerrad, Michael. Come as You Are: The Story of Nirvana. Doubleday, 1993. 
Berkenstadt, Jim; Cross, Charles. Classic Rock Albums: Nevermind. Schirmer, 1998. 
Cross, Charles. Heavier Than Heaven: A Biography of Kurt Cobain. Hyperion, 2001. 
Sandford, Christopher. Kurt Cobain. Carroll & Graff, 1995.

External links

Nevermind at YouTube (streamed copy where licensed)

1991 albums
2011 live albums
2011 video albums
Albums produced by Butch Vig
DGC Records albums
Nirvana (band) albums
Nirvana (band) live albums
Nirvana (band) video albums
United States National Recording Registry recordings
Albums recorded at Sound City Studios
United States National Recording Registry albums